Ian McGillis (born March 27, 1962, in Hull, Quebec) is a Canadian writer and journalist. He regularly contributes to the Montreal Gazette and previously co-edited the Montreal Review of Books. His works have been shortlisted three times for Quebec Writers' Federation Awards.

Biography 
McGillis was born March 27, 1962, in Hull, Quebec. He "grew up in Edmonton, and now lives in Montreal."

McGillis regularly contributes to the Montreal Gazette, as well as other news outlets. Together with Margaret Goldik, he used to co-edit the Montreal Review of Books.

Awards and honours 
In 2004, McGillis and Margaret Goldik received the Judy Mappin Community Award from the Quebec Writers' Federation "for the professionalism and judgment they brought to their work as co-editors of the Montreal Review of Books."

Publications 

 Tourist's Guide to Glengarry (2002, The Porcupine's Quill, ISBN:  9780889842465)
 Higher Ground: One Person's Lifelong Relationship with Soul, Reggae and Rap (2015, Biblioasis, ISBN: 9781771960489)

References 

1962 births
Writers from Quebec
21st-century Canadian writers